The Eighth constituency for French residents overseas (huitième circonscription des Français établis hors de France) is one of eleven constituencies each electing one representative of French citizens overseas to the French National Assembly.

This constituency elected its first ever representative at the 2012 French legislative election.

Area
It covers all French citizens living in the following eight countries: Cyprus, Greece, the Holy See (Vatican), Israel, Italy, Malta, San Marino, and Turkey. As of New Year's Day 2011, it contained 144,505 registered French citizens - of which 78,748 in Israel, 46,554 in Italy, and just 17 in the Holy See.

France does not recognise a State of Palestine, but French residents in Gaza and the West Bank, counted as residents of Israel, are entitled to vote. There were 229 registered French citizens in Gaza or the West Bank at the creation of the constituency, and a polling station was opened in Ramallah.

Deputies

Election results

2023 by-election
The 2022 election was annulled by the Constitutional Council, and the by-election will take place on 2nd and 16th April.

2022

 
 
 
 
|-
| colspan="8" bgcolor="#E9E9E9"|
|-

2017

2013 by-election 
The first round of the by-election was held on 26 May, and the second round was held on 9 June. Citizens wishing to cast their ballot over the Internet for the first round were able to do so from 15 to 21 May.

Candidates
There were twenty candidates:
 Marie-Rose Koro, a resident of Turkey, for the Socialist Party
 Valérie Hoffenberg once more for the UMP
 Michèle Parravicini once more for the Left Front
 Athanase Contargyris, a Franco-Greek businessman living in Athens, for Europe Écologie-The Greens
 Meyer Habib, the deputy leader of the Representative Council of French Jewish Institutions, for the centre-right Union of Democrats and Independents
 Alix Guillard for the Pirate Party
 Jonathan Simon Sellem for the classical liberal Liberal Democratic Party; a resident of Israel, he expressed the intention of defending Israeli interests in the French Parliament
 Julien Lemaitre once more for Solidarity and Progress
 Twelve independent candidates. Among them, Alexandre Bezardin, a dissident from the UMP. He had been Hoffenberg's suppléant the previous year, but now stood against her.

Results
Turnout in the first round was very low: 10.37%, with a "high" point of 14.56% in Greece and a low point of 7.03% in Israel. In a notable departure from the result of the previous year, the Socialist candidate was eliminated in the first round, leaving the UMP and UDI candidates to advance to the run-off. UMP dissident Alexandre Bezardin, standing as an independent, finished fourth, mostly attracting votes in Italy (where he came third, well ahead of Habib).

2012

Candidates
The list of candidates was officially finalised on 14 May. There were ten candidates:

The Union for a Popular Movement chose Valérie Hoffenberg, a former president of the American Jewish Committee in France, as its candidate. Alexandre Bezardin was her deputy (suppléant).

The Socialist Party chose Daphna Poznanski-Benhamou, a legal consultant and resident of Tel Aviv. Her deputy (suppléant) was Philippe Hébrard, a resident of Rome.

The Left Front chose Michèle Parravicini, a teacher of Italian origin. A resident of Greece, she had also lived in Italy and lived and worked in Turkey. Her deputy (suppléant) was Guillaume Mariel.

Europe Écologie–The Greens chose Pierre Jestin, a resident of Milan, with Mélanie Lacide as his deputy (suppléante).

The National Front did not present a candidate of its own, but endorsed Huguette Livernault-Lévy, of the small, new far-right party Sovereignty, Independence and Freedoms, which was allied to the National Front as part of the "Marine blue gathering" (rassemblement bleu Marine). Florian Dufait was her deputy.

The Radical Party of the Left chose Corinne Rouffi. Of dual French and Israeli citizenship, she pledged to support the interests of French residents "on both sides of the wall", in Israel and Palestine. She also promised to support the accession of Turkey to the European Union, "with the recognition of the Kurdish people and their autonomous status". Adnan Kaya was her deputy.

Solidarity and Progress, the French branch of the LaRouche movement, was represented by Julien Lemaître, with Éric Sauze as her deputy.

Philippe Karsenty was a candidate of the miscellaneous right, endorsed by the Liberal Democratic Party and the Christian Democratic Party, although he was a member of neither. Éric Veron was his deputy.

Gil Taïeb, who defined himself as a "militant Zionist", stood as an "independent humanist centrist", focusing solely on the French community in Israel. Avi Zana was his deputy.

Guy Fitoussi was an independent candidate, with Arié Bengenou as his deputy.

Results
As in other constituencies, turnout in the first round was low. It was at its lowest in Israel (7.6%), and highest in Turkey (just 24%). Socialist candidate Daphna Poznanski-Benhamou finished first, ahead of a divided right with strong dissident candidates. Pierre Jestin also obtained a good result for the Greens (10.5% overall; 15.9% in Italy). Poznanski-Benhamou finished first in every country, except in Israel, where independent candidates Philippe Karsenty and Gil Taïeb came first and second respectively, and in Malta where she came second to Valérie Hoffenberg (UMP) by just five votes.

The results in Israel (with an extremely low turnout) were notably different from the rest of the constituency. Gil Taïeb was standing as an independent right-wing candidate with an exclusive focus on Israel, promising to defend its interests along right-wing lines, while Philippe Karsenty, also an independent right-wing candidate, was already known for his campaign to support Israel's image abroad. Karsenty finished first in Israel with 30.40% of the vote, while Taïeb obtained 26.36%, and Poznanski-Benhamou 19.66%. Hoffenberg was relegated to fourth place with 19.26%. In Italy, however, Karsenty finished fifth, and obtained fairly few votes in other countries. Taïeb, finishing eighth in Italy, obtained only a handful of votes outside Israel. (In Turkey, Taïeb obtained only 10 votes (1.00%), just 3 votes in Cyprus (1.46%), and just 1 vote in Malta (1.14%).)

Subsequent annulment
In February 2013, the election of Daphna Poznanski-Benhamou was annulled by the Constitutional Council, due to irregularities in the funding of her electoral campaign. She was barred from standing for public office for a period of one year. Defeated candidates Gil Taïeb and Philippe Karsenty were also barred from standing for public office for a year, for the same reason.

References

8